Graziano Cesari (born 23 December 1956 in Parma, Italy) is a former Italian professional football referee. He was a full international for FIFA from 1994 until 2002.

Cesari originally was named to the Italian Football Hall of Fame in 2016, however his award was later revoked due to a disciplinary action from 2003.

References 

1956 births
Living people
Italian football referees
Sportspeople from Parma